29th NSFC Awards
January 3, 1995

Best Film: 
 Pulp Fiction 
The 29th National Society of Film Critics Awards, given on 3 January 1995, honored the best filmmaking of 1994.

Winners

Best Picture 
1. Pulp Fiction
2. Red (Trois couleurs: Rouge)
3. Hoop Dreams

Best Director 
1. Quentin Tarantino – Pulp Fiction
2. Krzysztof Kieślowski – Red (Trois couleurs: Rouge)
3. Louis Malle – Vanya on 42nd Street

Best Actor 
1. Paul Newman – Nobody's Fool
2. Samuel L. Jackson – Pulp Fiction
3. John Travolta – Pulp Fiction

Best Actress 
1. Jennifer Jason Leigh – Mrs. Parker and the Vicious Circle
2. Jessica Lange – Blue Sky
3. Linda Fiorentino – The Last Seduction

Best Supporting Actor 
1. Martin Landau – Ed Wood
2. Samuel L. Jackson – Pulp Fiction
3. Paul Scofield – Quiz Show

Best Supporting Actress 
1. Dianne Wiest – Bullets Over Broadway
2. Uma Thurman – Pulp Fiction
3. Brooke Smith – Vanya on 42nd Street

Best Screenplay 
1. Quentin Tarantino and Roger Avary – Pulp Fiction
2. Paul Attanasio – Quiz Show
3. Krzysztof Kieślowski and Krzysztof Piesiewicz – Red (Trois couleurs: Rouge)

Best Cinematography 
Stefan Czapsky – Ed Wood

Best Foreign Language Film 
1. Red (Trois couleurs: Rouge)
2. To Live (Huozhe)
3. Caro Diario

Best Documentary 
Hoop Dreams

Experimental Film 
Sátántangó
The Pharaoh's Belt

References

External links
Past Awards

1994
National Society of Film Critics Awards
National Society of Film Critics Awards
National Society of Film Critics Awards